Loree Griffin Burns is an American scientist and children's book author focusing on science and the scientific method.

Early life  
Burns grew up in Massachusetts. She studied biology at Worcester Polytechnic Institute and graduated with her Bachelor of Science in 1991. She received her Master of Fine Arts in Creative Nonfiction from Bay Path University. She received her PhD in biochemistry from University of Massachusetts Medical School, focusing her studies on yeast gene regulation.

Career 
Before becoming an author, Burns worked as a research scientist. She wrote her first book in 2007 entitled Tracking Trash: Flotsam, Jetsam, and the Science of Ocean Motion after she became fascinated by the story of a shipping accident wherein thousands of bathtub toys were lost at sea, only to later wash ashore in New England. She is the author of several books of children’s nonfiction, including the middle grade titles Tracking Trash, The Hive Detectives, Citizen Scientists, Beetle Busters, and Life on Surtsey, as well as the picture books Handle with Care and You’re Invited to a Moth Ball. These books have been awarded American Library Association Notable designations, a Boston Globe–Horn Book Honor Book Award, an IRA Children’s Book Award, a Green Earth Book Award, and two Science Books & Films (SB&F) Prizes.  She is also on the faculty list of Vermont College of Fine Arts.

Recognition 
Her accolades include:

 American Library Association Notable Lists - 2018 Notable Children's Books
 Boston Globe-Horn Book Award - 2007 Nonfiction Honor Book
International Reading Association Children’s Book Award
 two AAAS Science Books & Films prizes.

Published books

References 

Worcester Polytechnic Institute alumni
American children's writers
University of Massachusetts Medical School alumni
Living people
Year of birth missing (living people)